Chaetodon ulietensis, the Pacific double-saddle butterflyfish or false falcula butterflyfish, is a species of butterflyfish (family Chaetodontidae). It flourishes in coral-rich environments in the central Indo-Pacific region. Their range extends from the Cocos-Keeling Islands to the Tuamotu Islands, and north to Japan. They are usually found from the surface to 20 m depths, and like shallow channels with high current.

Description and systematics 
They are white with vertical thin black lines down the body and two dark saddles on the fore and hind back, which softly grade into the background colour caudal gradient. Immediately after the hind quarter saddle, the body and tail is bright yellow swith a black spot on the caudal peduncle. The dorsal fin has a streak of yellow from the crown of the head to the tail. Like most of its relatives, this species displays a black eye band like a mask. As in most butterflyfish, the Pacific double-saddle butterflyfish is prone to blanching at night and when startled.

It belongs to the large subgenus Rabdophorus which might warrant recognition as a distinct genus. In this group, the closest relative of this particular species is the similar-looking black-wedged butterflyfish, C. falcula. Other fairly close relatives are the quite differently-shaped but similarly-coloured lined (C. lineolatus) and spot-naped butterflyfishes (C. oxycephalus), while the blue-cheeked butterflyfish (C. semilarvatus) seems to be a far more basal lineage relative to all of these. The vertical lines are present in all of these, while a white body with yellow behind and black on back and caudal peduncle are only shared among the four less ancient species.

Ecology 
Chaetodon ulietensis is often found singly or in pairs on coral-rich reef systems, foraging on sessile invertebrates and algae. It is not a territorial species that freely grazes throughout a wide range within reefs, lagoons and harbors, and every now and then large groups congregate at rich feeding spots. It is rarely ever observed in a deep reef environment or the open sea; juveniles are typically reared in shallow lagoons, estuaries or harbors.

An opportunistic omnivore, diet consists mainly of microscopic algae, other plankton, and small sessile invertebrates. As a measure of defense, they typically wedge themselves in tight crevasses to escape predators.

In the aquarium 
Although common in the wild, it is rarely imported by the aquarium trade. In aquarist terms, it is considered a hardy Chaetodon and beneficial for the control of nuisance pests. The Pacific Double-saddle Butterflyfish has been observed as a beneficial predator of Aiptasia and Majano sea anemones. Like most Raccoon Butterflyfish (C. lunula), C. ulietensis will eliminate this nuisance within a 2- to 6-week period depending on the anemone population and size of the tank. And unlike most raccoon butterflyfish, this species rarely feeds on ornamental corals. The Pacific Double-saddle Butterflyfish readily accepts most prepared frozen and dry foods, thus it can easily make the transition to aquarium life, unlike the Copperband Butterflyfish (Chelmon rostratus) or other less hardy Chaetodon species.

Footnotes

References 

  (2007): Molecular phylogenetics of the butterflyfishes (Chaetodontidae): Taxonomy and biogeography of a global coral reef fish family. Mol. Phylogenet. Evol. 45(1): 50–68.  (HTML abstract)
  (2008): Chaetodon ulietensis. Version of 2008-JUL-24. Retrieved 2008-SEP-01.
  (2007): Molecular phylogeny of Chaetodon (Teleostei: Chaetodontidae) in the Indo-West Pacific: evolution in geminate species pairs and species groups. Raffles Bulletin of Zoology Supplement 14: 77-86. PDF fulltext

External links 
 Australian Museum Online
 

ulietensis
Fish described in 1831
Taxa named by Georges Cuvier